This is a partial discography of Hector Berlioz's opera, Les Troyens. It was first performed on 4 November 1863 consisted of Acts 3 to 5 only. The first staged performance of the whole opera took place in 1890, 21 years after Berlioz's death.

Colin Davis's recording in 1969 (released in 1970) was the first complete recording of this opera.

Recordings

References
Notes

Sources
 

Opera discographies
Operas by Hector Berlioz